Eredivisie, literally translated to English as Honorary Division, refers to the top level of competition in Netherlands in a number of sports, most commonly association football. Professional sport leagues that utilize the title include:
 Eredivisie, the men's association football league.
 Beloften Eredivisie, the men's association football reserve league
 Eredivisie (basketball), former name for men's basketball league, which is now known even in Dutch by the English-language name of Dutch Basketball League.
 Eredivisie (women), the women's association football league.
 Eredivisie (women's handball), the women's handball league.
 Eredivisie (men's handball), the men's handball league.
 Eredivisie (ice hockey), the men's ice hockey league.